Klára Melíšková (born 29 November 1971, in Roudnice nad Labem) is a Czech stage and film actress. She is the wife of actor Lukáš Hlavica, daughter-in-law of actor and painter Miloš Hlavica and actress Růžena Merunková and sister-in-law Anna Bendová.

She studied an acting in alternative and muppets' theatre Theatre Academy of music Arts in 1999.

Theatre

Dejvické divadlo, Prague 
Anatomie gagu (1996)
Lysistrate (1996) .... Lysistrate (Aristophanes)
Twelfe months (1996) .... Holena (Oldřich Kryštofek)
Kennedyho děti (1996) .... Rona (Robert Patrick)
The Green Bird (1997) .... Tartagliona / Old Sogomora (Carlo Gozzi)
Utišující metoda (1997) .... Central (Edgar Allan Poe)
Pazour (1998) .... Angie (Howard Barker)
Twelfth Nights (1999) .... Viola (William Shakespeare)
O zaklatém hadovi (2001) .... Baba Jaga
Tales of Insanity Stories (2001) .... Jana
The Brothers Karamazow (2002) .... Kateřina
Three Sisters (2002) .... Olga (Anton Pavlovich Chekhov)
Sirup (play) (2002) .... Mrs. Knoblochová (Miroslav Krobot)
The Magic Flute (2003) .... second boy, third lady ((Wolfgang Amadeus Mozart)
SEKEC MAZEC (2004)
KFT/sendviče reality@ (2005) .... Carolyn (Karel František Tománek)
The Idiot (play) (2008) .... Nastasja Filipovna (Fjodor Michajlovich Dostojevskij, Miroslav Krobot)
Teremin (play) (2008) .... Kateřina (Petr Zelenka)
Dračí doupe (2008) .... Homeless Woman (Viliam Klimáček)
Hlasy (2009) .... Marie (David Jařab)
The Man Without a Past (2010) .... Mrs. Nieminen (Aki Kaurismäki)
Černá díra (2010) .... gas station attendant (Doyle Doubt)
Krajina se zbraní (2010) .... Mrs. Ross (Joe Penhall)
Spříznění volbou (2010) .... baronessa (Johann Wolfgang Goethe)
Wanted Welzl (2011) ... Jane (Karel František Tománek)
Ucpanej systém (2012) .... Katriona (Irvine Walsh)

Filmography 
 1998 Minulost .... Girl
 2003 Tajemný svícen (TV)
 2004 Mistři .... Zdena
 2007 Kolotoč (TV)
 2007 Hodina klavíru (TV) .... Johanka
 2008 BrainStorm (TV) .... Mrs. Jeklová
 2009 Protektor .... Věra
 2009 Nespavost TV)
 2010 Zázraky života (TV)
 2011 Terapie (TV series) .... Alice Poštová
 2011 Čapkovy kapsy (TV series)
 2011 Alois Nebel .... Nurse
 2012 Čtyři slunce .... Eva
2014 Andělé všedního dne
2014 Život a doba soudce A. K. (TV series)
2014 Díra u Hanušovic
2015 Laputa
2015 Případ pro exorcistu (TV miniseries)
2016 Modré stíny (TV miniseries)
 2016 I, Olga Hepnarová .... Olga's mother
2016 Pět mrtvých psů
2016 Tiger Theory
2017 Dabing Street (TV series)
2017 Trapný padesátky (TV series)
2017 Mordparta (TV series)
2017 Zahradnictví trilogy
2019 Zkáza Dejvického divadla .... self
2019 Terapie.... Alice Poštová
2019 Owners.... Mrs. Roubícková
2022 Suspicion (TV series) .... nurse Hana Kučerová

Awards 
 2004 Czech Lion for Best Supporting Actress – film Mistři
 2012 Czech Lion for Best Supporting Actress – film Čtyři slunce
 2016 Czech Lion for Best Supporting Actress – film I, Olga Hepnarová
 2019 Czech Lion for Best Supporting Actress – film Owners
 2022 Czech Lion for Best Actress in Leading Role – television series Suspicion

External links 
 Klára Melíšková na stránkách Dejvického divadla
 Czechoslovak film database
 

Czech television actresses
Living people
Czech stage actresses
Czech film actresses
1971 births
People from Roudnice nad Labem
Academy of Performing Arts in Prague alumni
20th-century Czech actresses
21st-century Czech actresses
Czech Lion Awards winners